Second Fiddle to a Steel Guitar is a 1965 American comedy film directed by Victor Duncan, and is notable for the reunion of Bowery Boys' actors Leo Gorcey and Huntz Hall, who had last appeared in a film together nine years earlier—in Crashing Las Vegas.  The film was released on September 15, 1965, by Marathon Pictures.

Plot
Jubal A. Bristol loves country music, but his wife thinks it is beneath her to listen to it.  Mrs. Bristol is planning an opera event, but the company that was supposed to play are stranded in New York City.  Jubal gathers a large group of country artists to come and play the opera in their place and saves the day.

Cast
 Arnold Stang as Jubal A. Bristol
 Pamela Hayes as Mrs. Bristol
 Leo Gorcey as Leo
 Huntz Hall as Huntz

The cast includes a variety of country music guest stars, including Little Jimmy Dickens, Lefty Frizzell, Bill Monroe and The Bluegrass Boys, Dottie West, George Hamilton IV, Pete Drake, Sonny James, Minnie Pearl, Billy Walker, Connie Smith, Johnnie Wright, Kitty Wells, Del Reeves, Faron Young, and Webb Pierce.

Home media
The film was released on DVD on February 27, 2007.

Significance
This was Gorcey and Hall's first appearance together in a color film, after starring in dozens of black & white films together as "The Dead End Kids", "East Side Kids", and "The Bowery Boys" from the 1930s to the 1950s.

References

External links 

1965 films
1965 comedy films
American comedy films
1960s English-language films
1960s American films